1986 in philosophy

Events

Publications 
 Saunders Mac Lane, Mathematics, Form and Function
 Hans Blumenberg, Lebenszeit und Weltzeit (not yet translated into English)
 David Gauthier, Morals by Agreement
 David Lewis, On the Plurality of Worlds
 Martha Nussbaum, The Fragility of Goodness
 Thomas Nagel, The View from Nowhere

Deaths 
 January 9 - Michel de Certeau (born 1925)
 February 17 - Jiddu Krishnamurti (born 1895)
 February 19 - André Leroi-Gourhan (born 1911)
 April 14 - Simone de Beauvoir (born 1908)

References 

Philosophy
20th-century philosophy
Philosophy by year